The Caesars is a British television series produced by Granada Television for the ITV network in 1968.  Made in black-and-white and written and produced by Philip Mackie, it covered dramatic territory similar to that of the later BBC adaptation of I, Claudius, dealing with the lives of the early emperors of Ancient Rome, but differed in its less sensationalist depictions of historical characters and their motives; in particular, the Emperor Tiberius is portrayed much more sympathetically.

Major cast
The major cast included:
 Roland Culver as Augustus
 Eric Flynn as Germanicus
 André Morell as Tiberius
 Barrie Ingham as Sejanus
 Ralph Bates as Caligula
 Freddie Jones as Claudius
 Sonia Dresdel as Livia
 Nicola Pagett as Messalina
 Suzan Farmer as Livilla
 William Corderoy as Drusus Julius Caesar
 Derek Newark as Agrippa Postumus
 Caroline Blakiston as Agrippina the Elder
 Martin Potter as Nero Julius Caesar
 Jonathan Collins as Tiberius Gemellus
 Pollyanna Williams as Julia Drusilla
 Jenny White as Julia Livilla
 Karol Keyes as Agrippina the Younger
 Barbara Murray as Milonia Caesonia
 Jerome Willis as Naevius Sutorius Macro
 Kevin Stoney as Thrasyllus of Mendes
 Donald Eccles as Marcus Cocceius Nerva
 John Phillips as Gnaeus Calpurnius Piso
 John Paul as Cassius Chaerea
 Joan Heath as Munatia Plancina
 Wanda Ventham as Ennia Thrasylla
 Sean Arnold as Marcus Aemlius Lepidus
 John Normington as Gaius Julius Callistus
 John Woodvine as Publius Vitellius the Younger
 Gerald Harper as Lucius Vitellius the Elder
 Mark Hawkins as Mnester
 Roger Rowland as Quintus Veranius
 Charles Lloyd-Pack as Crispus
 George Sewell as Ennius

Episode list

All six episodes were written by Philip Mackie and directed by Derek Bennett.

DVD release
The Caesars was released on DVD (Region 2, UK) by Network in April 2006.

External links
 

ITV television dramas
Period television series
Television dramas set in ancient Rome
1968 British television series debuts
1968 British television series endings
1960s British drama television series
1960s British television miniseries
Television series by ITV Studios
Television series set in the Roman Empire
Television series set in the 1st century
Television shows produced by Granada Television
English-language television shows
Black-and-white British television shows
British historical television series
Depictions of Augustus on television
Depictions of Caligula on television
Cultural depictions of Messalina
Cultural depictions of Tiberius
Cultural depictions of Agrippina the Elder
Cultural depictions of Agrippina the Younger
Cultural depictions of Claudius
Cultural depictions of Julia Drusilla
Cultural depictions of Germanicus